Nongtalang College, Nongtalang, West Jaintia Hills district, Meghalaya, India was Established in the year 1988, by the people and village Durbar (Council) of Nongtalang to promote the cause of Higher Education in Nongtalang Village in Particular and War-Jaintia area in general, under the leadership of (L) Mr. J.D. Pohrmen, Ex-Deputy Chief Minister of Meghalaya and (L) Mr. Chuidu Lyngdoh Headman Nongtalang village. The main objective of the Village Council in establishing the college is to provide education to the poor and needy students of the areas, whose parents could not afford to send their sons/daughters to Town and Cities for higher studies. The College was registered under Meghalaya Societies Registration Act, XII of 1983 and Recognized by UGC under Section 12 (B) & 2(f)  of the UGC  Act, 1956. Accredited by NAAC (National Assessment and Accreditation Council) on 09-June-2017, Grade B.

References

External links

Universities and colleges in Meghalaya
West Jaintia Hills district
Colleges affiliated to North-Eastern Hill University
Educational institutions established in 1988
1988 establishments in Meghalaya